Founded in 1984, The ASCII Group, Inc. is the oldest and largest group of independent information technology (IT) solution providers, systems integrators, managed service providers (MSP)  and value added resellers (VAR). ASCII is the largest paying community of independent computer solution providers, system integrators, and valued added resellers in the world.

History 
The original ASCII business model was created in 1984 by Alan Weinberger who forged the network out of a failing franchise of software retail stores owned by Ashton-Tate, a major software publisher. 40 independent software retailers decided to join together as a buying group and pay monthly fees to support their organization, in turn supporting each other and their programs for mutual benefit.

Debuting in 2000, ASCII holds 9 annual Success Summits each year throughout the United States and Canada. In 2015, ASCII partnered with TTR, Inc. and announced a support service for sales tax questions.

See also 

 ASCII
 ASCII art

References

External links
 ASCII Group
ASCI

Information technology companies of the United States
International information technology consulting firms
Companies based in Bethesda, Maryland
American companies established in 1984
Consulting firms established in 1984
Technology companies established in 1984
1984 establishments in Maryland
Science and technology in Maryland